Tools in the Dryer is a [[2001 in 2001 album by Lambchop. It compiles rarities from across the band's career, including early demos and live performances.

Track listing
 "Nine"
 "Whitey"
 "Cigaretiquette"
 "Miss Prissy"
 "The Petrified Florist"
 "Each with a Bag of Fries"
 "All over the World"
 "Flowers of Memory"
 "Scared Out of My Shoes"
 "Style Monkeys"
 "The Militant" (Mark Robinson Remix)
 "Up with People" (Zero 7 Reprise Remix)
 "Give Me Your Love" (Doppelganger Remix)
 "Love TKO"
 "Or Thousands of Prizes"
 "Moody Fucker"

References

 

2001 albums
Lambchop (band) albums